The 2013 Junior League World Series took place from August 11–17 in Taylor, Michigan, United States. Taoyuan, Taiwan defeated Rio Rico, Arizona in the championship game.

Teams

Results

United States Pool

International Pool

Elimination Round

References

Junior League World Series
Junior League World Series